Tom Stern may refer to:

 Tom Stern (filmmaker) (born 1965), film and television writer and director
 Tom Stern (cinematographer) (born 1946), American cinematographer
 Tom Stern (actor), former husband of Samantha Eggar